Levi Ziegler Leiter (November 2, 1834 – June 9, 1904) was an American businessman based in Chicago. He co-founded what became the Marshall Field & Company retail empire.

Early life 
Leiter was born to Anne (née Ziegler) and Joseph Thomas Leiter, of Leitersburg, the Washington County, Maryland, town founded by his grandfather, Abraham Leiter's brother Andrew Leiter (Bell, 184). Although some have confused Leiter's ancestry as Jewish (likely because of his first name), his family was of German Swiss descent and some of his ancestors had been Mennonites. Leiter was raised a Lutheran.

Career
As a boy, Leiter worked for a dry goods business in Springfield, Ohio. In 1853 he began working as a bookkeeper at Chicago's then-largest dry goods company, Cooley, Wadsworth & Co., where he worked alongside Marshall Field and Potter Palmer. Leiter and Field became partners in the firm, but in 1865, they sold their interest in the company to John V. Farwell and went into business, along with Palmer, as Field, Palmer, Leiter & Co.

In 1867, Palmer left his business to pursue real estate ventures, and the company was renamed Field, Leiter & Co. Field & Leiter built a six-story store on State Street in 1868. It was rebuilt after the Great Chicago Fire in 1871. From 1874 to 1880, Leiter was a member of the Executive Committee of the Chicago Relief and Aid Society, which helped collect and distribute funds to rebuild Chicago after the fire. When Leiter sold his interest to Field and retired from the dry goods business in 1881, the name was changed to Marshall Field and Company.

As Leiter's wealth increased, he invested much of his savings in Chicago real estate. After retirement from Field, Leiter & Co., he devoted his attention to real estate and corporate interests. He later devoted time to travel and philanthropy. He was the first president of the Commercial Club of Chicago, the second president of the Chicago Art Institute, a president of the Chicago Historical Society, and a prominent figure in the Illinois Trust Company.

Joseph Leiter

From 1892 to 1898, his son Joseph was his agent. Joseph attempted to corner the wheat market from 1897 to 1898, and was briefly the largest individual holder of wheat in the history of the grain trade. Concerted action by his competitors broke the corner. Levi paid millions of dollars to settle Joseph's debts after the market crashed in 1898.  Levi's losses were reputed to run to $10 million. Joseph was later the founder of the company town of Zeigler, Illinois, and president of the Zeigler Coal Company and the Chicago, Zeigler and Gulf Railway Company; he was also a director of the American Security and Trust Company.

Personal life
In 1866, Leiter married Mary Theresa Carver (1844–1913) of Chicago. From 1885 until her death, she served as the second Vice Regent for Illinois in the Mount Vernon Ladies' Association, which is occupied with the preservation of George Washington's Mount Vernon estate. Together, they were the parents of:

 Joseph Leiter (1868–1932), who graduated from Harvard University in 1891 and who married Juliette Williams (1887–1942).
 Mary Victoria Leiter (1870–1906), who married the British Conservative statesman George Curzon, Viceroy of India from 1899 to 1905 and later 1st Marquess Curzon of Kedleston, in 1895.
 Nancy Lathrop Carver Leiter (1873–1930), the sponsor of USS Illinois (BB-7) who married Colin Powys Campbell (1859–1923).
 Margaret Hyde Leiter (1880–1968), who married Henry Molineux Howard (1877–1917), the 19th Earl of Suffolk and 12th Earl of Berkshire.

Leiter died of heart disease at the Vanderbilt family cottage in Bar Harbor, Maine on June 9, 1904. His estate became the subject of eight years of litigation.

Washington residence

In 1891, Leiter had a mansion built adjacent to Dupont Circle in Washington, D.C. This home, the Leiter House, was designed by Theophilus Chandler.  After his death, his Washington, D.C. home was used for elaborate parties hosted by his widow. During WWII, the mansion was leased to the U.S. Government for office space. The property was sold and the structure demolished in 1947. The site is now the location of the Dupont Hotel.

Descendants
Through his eldest daughter, he was the maternal grandfather of Mary Irene, Lady Ravensdale (b. 1896); Lady Cynthia Curzon (b. 1898), the first wife of Sir Oswald Mosley; and Alexandra Naldera Curzon (b. 1904), the wife of Edward Dudley Metcalfe, the best friend, best man and equerry of King Edward VIII.

Through his daughter Margaret, he was the maternal grandfather of Charles Howard, 20th Earl of Suffolk (1906–1941); Hon. Cecil John Arthur Howard (1908–1985), married Frances Dean; and Lt.-Cdr. Hon. Greville Reginald Howard (1909–1987).

Notes

References

External links
 David Leighton, "Street Smarts: Neighborhood, road named for Lady Suffolk," Arizona Daily Star, Oct. 21, 2014

Businesspeople from Chicago
1834 births
1904 deaths
American people of Swiss descent
People from Dupont Circle
19th-century American businesspeople
20th-century American businesspeople
People from Washington County, Maryland
Businesspeople from Maryland